Gieysztoria is a genus of Platyhelminthes belonging to the family Dalyelliidae.

The genus was first described by Ruebush and Hayes in 1939.

The genus has cosmopolitan distribution.

Species:
 Gieysztoria expedita
 Gieysztoria koiwi

References

Platyhelminthes